The provinces of Nepal were formed on 20 September 2015 in accordance with Schedule 4 of the Constitution of Nepal. The seven provinces were formed by grouping the existing districts. The current system of seven provinces replaced an earlier system where Nepal was divided into 14 administrative zones which were grouped into five development regions. (

History

A committee was formed to restructure administrative divisions of Nepal on 23 December 1956 and in two weeks, a report was submitted to the government. In accordance with The Report On Reconstruction Of Districts Of Nepal, 2013, the country was first divided into total 7 Kshetras (area). 
 Koshi
 Madhesh
 Bagmati
 Gandaki
 Lumbini 
 Karnali 
 Sudurpashchim
In 1962, all Kshetras were dissolved and the country was restructured into 75 development districts; those districts were further grouped into 14 zones. In 1972, all 14 zones were grouped into 4 development regions; later in 1981, they were rearranged into the following 5 development regions.
Eastern Development Region
Central Development Region
Western Development Region
Mid-Western Development Region
Far-Western Development Region

The provinces of Nepal were formed according to Schedule 4 of the Constitution of Nepal. The seven provinces were formed by grouping the existing districts; two districts, namely Nawalparasi and Rukum, were split between two provinces. Each district has local units. Local level bodies in Nepal include six metropolises, 11 sub-metropolises, 276 municipal councils and 460 village councils. The current system of seven provinces replaced an earlier system where Nepal was divided into 14 administrative zones which were grouped into five development regions.

In January 2016 the Government of Nepal announced temporary headquarters of the seven provinces. According to Article 295 (2), the permanent names of the provinces will be determined by a two-thirds vote of the respective province's legislature.

Government
The executive power of the provinces, pursuant to the constitution and laws, is vested in the council of ministers of the province. The executive power of the province shall be exercised by the province head (governor) in case of absence of the province executive in a state of emergency or enforcement of the federal rule. Every province has a ceremonial head as the representative of the federal government. The President appoints a governor for every province. The governor exercises the rights and duties as to be performed specified in the constitution or laws. The governor appoints the leader of the parliamentary party with the majority in the provincial assembly as the chief minister and the council of ministers are formed under the chairpersonship of the chief minister.

Assemblies

The Pradesh Sabha is the unicameral legislative assembly of each of the seven federal provinces. The term for the members of the provincial assemblies is five years, except when dissolved earlier.

Candidates for each constituency are chosen by the political parties or stand as independents. Each constituency elects one member under the first past the post system of election. Since Nepal uses a parallel voting system, voters cast another ballot to elect members through the party-list proportional representation. The current constitution specifies that sixty percent of the members should be elected from the first past the post system and forty percent through the party-list proportional representation system. Women should account for one-third of total members elected from each party and if one-third percentage are not elected, the party that fails to ensure so shall have to elect one-third of total number as women through the party-list proportional representation.

A party with an overall majority (more seats than all other parties combined) following an election forms the government. If a party has no outright majority, parties can seek to form coalitions.

List of provinces of Nepal

See also
 List of districts in Nepal
 List of Nepalese provinces by population
 List of Nepalese provinces by GDP
 List of Nepalese provinces by HDI
 Administrative divisions of Nepal

References 

  

Provinces of Nepal
Subdivisions of Nepal
2015 establishments in Nepal